Kostomarov may refer to:
 Grigory Kostomarov (1896–1970), Soviet historian.
 Mykola Kostomarov (1817–1885), Russian historian.
 Roman Kostomarov (b. 1977), Russian ice dancer.

Russian-language surnames